Tlik is a village in the Arevut Municipality of the Aragatsotn Province of Armenia, near the Armenia–Turkey border. The majority of the inhabitants are Yezidis.

References 

 
 Report of the results of the 2001 Armenian Census

Populated places in Aragatsotn Province
Yazidi populated places in Armenia